Elisha Smith Thomas (March 2, 1834 – March 9, 1895) was second bishop of the Episcopal Diocese of Kansas from 1889 to 1895.

Early life and education
Thomas was born on March 2, 1834, in Wickford, Rhode Island, the son of Allen Mason Thomas and Charlotte Smith. He was educated at Yale University, graduating in 1858. In 1859 he taught in a 'Deaf and Dumb Asylum' in Baton Rouge, Louisiana, while in 1869 he spent time travelling around Europe. He then enrolled to study theology at Berkeley Divinity School and graduated in 1861. In 1887, Yale awarded him with an honorary Doctor of Divinity.

Ordained Ministry
Thomas was ordained deacon on May 17, 1861, by Bishop Thomas M. Clark at St Paul's Church in Wickford, Rhode Island, and then priest on April 5, 1862, at St Paul's Church in New Haven, Connecticut, by Bishop John Williams. On October 2, 1861, he married Georgine M. Brown. Between 1861 and 1864, he served as rector of St Paul's Church in New Haven, Connecticut, and then in 1864, he was elected rector of Seabury Divinity School in Faribault, Minnesota, and in 1865 he became Professor of Biblical Exegesis and Hebrew. In 1869 he spent time abroad studying the Semitic languages. In 1870 he became rector of St Mark's Church in Minnesota and in 1876 he transferred to Saint Paul, Minnesota, to become the rector of St Paul's Church.

Bishop
Thomas was elected Assistant Bishop of Kansas on the first ballot on February 2, 1887. He was consecrated on May 4, 1887, in St Paul's Church, Saint Paul, Minnesota, by Bishop Henry Benjamin Whipple of Minnesota. He succeeded as diocesan bishop on October 6, 1889. He died in office in 1895.

External links 
Sermon Preached at the Consecration of the Rev. Elisha Smith Thomas (1887)

References

1834 births
1895 deaths
Berkeley Divinity School alumni
Yale University alumni
19th-century American Episcopalians
Episcopal bishops of Kansas
19th-century American clergy